The 10th Annual Interactive Achievement Awards is the 10th edition of the Interactive Achievement Awards, an annual awards event that honors the best games in the video game industry. It was also held as part of the Academy's 2007 D.I.C.E. Summit, and was hosted by Jay Mohr.

Gears of War received the most nominations and won the most awards, including Overall Game of the Year. Microsoft Game Studios and Nintendo tied for having the most nominations with Microsoft winning the most awards while Nintendo won the second most awards.

Dani Bunten also the received the of the Academy of Interactive Arts & Sciences Hall of Fame Award. Nintendo of America founders Minoru Arakawa and Howard Lincoln also became the first receivers of the Lifetime Achievement Award.

Winners and Nominees
Winners are listed first, highlighted in boldface, and indicated with a double dagger.

Special Awards

Hall of Fame
 Dani Bunten

Lifetime Achievement
 Minoru Arakawa
 Howard Lincoln

Games with multiple nominations and awards

The following 27 games received multiple nominations:

The following five games received multiple awards:

Companies with multiple nominations

Companies that received multiple nominations as either a developer or a publisher.

Companies that received multiple awards as either a developer or a publisher.

Notes

External links

References

2007 awards
2007 awards in the United States
February 2007 events in the United States
2006 in video gaming
D.I.C.E. Award ceremonies